Father Khalid Rehmat O.F.M. Cap. (born 5 August 1968) in Mianwali in the Roman Catholic Diocese of Islamabad-Rawalpindi, is the Apostolic Vicar of the  Apostolic Vicariate of Quetta in Pakistan.

He made the solemn profession of the Capuchin order in 2007.  He was Ordained Priest on 16 August 2008 in the Sacred Heart Cathedral, Lahore.

Rehmat worked as a primary school teacher before joining the Capuchin religious order. From 2008 to 2014 he taught at St. Mary's Minor Seminary, Lahore.

From 2014, Fr. Rehmat served as parish priest in Our Lady of Mount Carmel parish in Sialkot, in the Archdiocese of Lahore.  Since 2013, he has been editor of the bimonthly magazine Catholic Naqeeb.

In November 2020, he was elected Custos of the 'Mariam Siddeeqa Capuchin Custody' in Pakistan.

On January 1, 2021, Pope Francis named Father Khalid Rehmat as the new vicar apostolic of Quetta. He is the first Pakistani Capuchin priest to be named bishop. He was consecrated bishop at St Francis Grammar School in Quetta on 25 March 2021. Archbishop Christophe Zakhia El-Kassis, Apostolic Nuncio to Pakistan, was the main consecrator, with the co-consecrators Cardinal Joseph Coutts, Archbishop of Karachi, and Archbishop Joseph Arshad of Islamabad-Rawalpindi.

References

External links

1968 births
Living people
21st-century Roman Catholic bishops in Pakistan
People from Mianwali District
Capuchin bishops
Pakistani Friars Minor
Apostolic vicars of Quetta